Daniel Francis Boyle (born 20 October 1956) is an English director and producer. He is known for his work on films including Shallow Grave, Trainspotting and its sequel T2 Trainspotting, The Beach, 28 Days Later, Sunshine, Slumdog Millionaire, 127 Hours, Steve Jobs and Yesterday.

Boyle's debut film Shallow Grave won the BAFTA Award for Best British Film. The British Film Institute ranked Trainspotting the 10th greatest British film of the 20th century. Boyle's 2008 film Slumdog Millionaire, the most successful British film of the decade, was nominated for ten Academy Awards and won eight, including the Academy Award for Best Director. He also won the Golden Globe and BAFTA Award for Best Director. Boyle was presented with the Extraordinary Contribution to Filmmaking Award at the 2008 Austin Film Festival, where he also introduced that year's AFF Audience Award Winner Slumdog Millionaire.

In 2012, Boyle was the artistic director for Isles of Wonder, the opening ceremony of the 2012 Summer Olympics. He was subsequently offered a knighthood as part of the New Year Honours but declined due to his republican beliefs. In 2014, it was announced that Boyle would become a patron of HOME in Manchester.

Early life and background
Danny Boyle was born on 20 October 1956, in Radcliffe, Lancashire, England, about 6 miles north of Manchester's city centre, to Irish parents Frank and Annie Boyle, both from County Galway. He has a twin sister, Marie, and a younger sister, Bernadette, both of whom are teachers. Although he now describes himself as a "spiritual atheist," he was brought up in a working-class Catholic family. Boyle was an altar boy for eight years and his mother had the priesthood in mind for him, but at the age of 14 he was persuaded by a priest not to transfer to a seminary.

Boyle attended Thornleigh Salesian College, a Catholic boys' direct grant grammar school in Bolton, and studied English and Drama at the University College of North Wales (now Bangor University), where he directed several productions for the student drama society.

Theatre and television work

Upon graduating from university he began his career at the Joint Stock Theatre Company before moving on to the Royal Court Theatre in 1982 where he directed The Genius by Howard Brenton and Saved by Edward Bond. He also directed five productions for the Royal Shakespeare Company.

In 1987, Boyle started working in television as a producer for BBC Northern Ireland where he produced, amongst other TV films, Alan Clarke's controversial Elephant before becoming a director on shows such as Arise And Go Now, Not Even God Is Wise Enough, For The Greater Good, Scout, and two episodes of Inspector Morse.

Boyle was responsible for the BBC Two series Mr. Wroe's Virgins in 1993. In between The Beach and 28 Days Later Boyle directed two TV films for the BBC in 2001–Vacuuming Completely Nude in Paradise and Strumpet.

On 14 November 2010, he directed a one-night play at the Old Vic Theatre titled The Children's Monologues starring Sir Ben Kingsley, Benedict Cumberbatch, Tom Hiddleston, Gemma Arterton, and Eddie Redmayne. In 2011 he directed Frankenstein for the National Theatre. This production was broadcast to cinemas as a part of National Theatre Live on 17 March 2011. He has also appeared on Top Gear and set the fastest wet lap at that time. In 2014, both Boyle and Christian Colson signed to a first look deal with FX Productions.

In September 2022, Boyle was announced to be directing a dance adaptation of The Matrix, titled "Free Your Mind", and it is set to debut in October 2023 in Manchester, U.K.

Isles of Wonder 

Boyle was artistic director for the 2012 Summer Olympics opening ceremony in London. Entitled Isles of Wonder, it charted aspects of British culture including the Industrial Revolution and contributions to literature, music, film, and technology.

Reception to the ceremony was generally positive both nationally in the United Kingdom and internationally. In December 2012 it was widely reported that Boyle turned down a knighthood in the New Year Honours list. He told BBC Radio 4 "I'm very proud to be an equal citizen and I think that's what the opening ceremony was actually about."

Pistol 
On 11 January 2021, it was announced that Boyle would be adapting the Steve Jones' autobiography Lonely Boy into a six-part TV series entitled Pistol that charts the rise and fall of the Sex Pistols. The series aired on FX and Disney+ on 30 May 2022, and stars Emma Appleton, Louis Partridge and Maisie Williams, amongst others. The show was filmed in London.

Film
Boyle's love for film began with his first viewing of Apocalypse Now:
It had eviscerated my brain, completely. I was an impressionable twenty-one-year-old guy from the sticks. My brain had not been fed and watered with great culture, you know, as art is meant to do. It had been sandblasted by the power of cinema. And that's why cinema, despite everything we try to do, it remains a young man's medium, really, in terms of audience.

1990s: Shallow Grave and Trainspotting 
The first film Boyle directed was Shallow Grave. The film was the most commercially successful British film of 1995, won the BAFTA Award for Best British Film, and led to the production of Trainspotting. Working with writer John Hodge and producer Andrew Macdonald, Shallow Grave earned Boyle the Best Newcomer Award from the 1996 London Film Critics Circle. Critics credited these films with revitalising British cinema in the early '90s. The BFI ranked Trainspotting the 10th greatest British film of the 20th century.

Boyle declined an offer to direct the fourth film of the Alien franchise to make A Life Less Ordinary.

2000s: The Beach, 28 Days Later and Slumdog Millionaire 
Boyle's next project was an adaptation of the cult novel The Beach by Alex Garland. Filmed in Thailand with Leonardo DiCaprio, casting of the film led to a feud with Ewan McGregor. He then collaborated with Garland on the post-apocalyptic horror film 28 Days Later.

He also directed a short film Alien Love Triangle (starring Kenneth Branagh), which was intended to be one of three shorts within a feature film. However the project was cancelled after the two other shorts were made into feature films: Mimic starring Mira Sorvino and Impostor starring Gary Sinise. In 2004 Boyle directed Millions, scripted by Frank Cottrell Boyce. His next collaboration with Alex Garland was the 2007 science-fiction film Sunshine, featuring 28 Days Later star Cillian Murphy.

In 2008 he directed Slumdog Millionaire, the story of an impoverished child (Dev Patel) on the streets of Mumbai, India, who competes on the local version of Who Wants to Be a Millionaire?, for which Boyle won Academy and BAFTA Awards for Best Director. The most successful British film of the decade, the film won eight Academy Awards and seven BAFTA Awards. Boyle commented, "To be a film-maker...you have to lead. You have to be psychotic in your desire to do something. People always like the easy route. You have to push very hard to get something unusual, something different." Andrew Macdonald, producer of Trainspotting, said "Boyle takes a subject that you've often seen portrayed realistically, in a politically correct way, whether it's junkies or slum orphans, and he has managed to make it realistic but also incredibly uplifting and joyful." The success led a deal with Fox Searchlight.

Despite the commercial success of Slumdog Millionaire, Boyle also faced great criticism for his portrayal of India through a Western, idealized lens. Some critics saw the film as “poverty porn,” though Boyle argued he showed India’s “lust for life” and “resilience.”

2010s: 127 Hours, Steve Jobs and T2 Trainspotting 
In 2010, Boyle directed the film 127 Hours, starring James Franco and featuring Amber Tamblyn and Kate Mara. It was based on Aron Ralston's autobiography Between a Rock and a Hard Place, which detailed his struggle of being trapped under a boulder while canyoneering alone in Bluejohn Canyon, southeastern Utah. The film was released on 5 November 2010 to critical acclaim and got six nominations at the 83rd Academy Awards, including Best Picture and Best Adapted Screenplay for Boyle and Best Actor for Franco.

Boyle's next film was Trance, starring James McAvoy and Rosario Dawson. It has been reported another instalment of the 28 Days Later franchise is in the development stages. Boyle has stated previously that in theory the third instalment of the series would be titled 28 Months Later, but alluded to a film taking place somewhere else in the world he created in 28 Days Later and 28 Weeks Later. He was also stated to be producing the upcoming film Paani.

Boyle told an interviewer about the eclectic range of his films, "There's a theme running through all of them—and I just realised this. They're all about someone facing impossible odds and overcoming them." With a strong interest in music, Boyle has mentioned in interviews that he has considered a musical film with original compositions. Boyle has also expressed interest in an animated film.

Boyle's eponymous biopic of Apple Inc. founder Steve Jobs closed the 59th BFI London Film Festival. It was the third time Boyle has had that honour, after Slumdog Millionaire in 2008 and 127 Hours two years later. The BFI's London Film Festival Director, Clare Stewart, said Boyle had created an exhilarating and audacious film about a complex, charismatic pioneer. He then directed the sequel to Trainspotting, T2 Trainspotting.

In a BBC interview, Boyle stated that he didn't write his own films but they did reflect his personality. "I am not a big auteur fan and like to work with writers, but ultimately a film is a director's vision, because he gets all its elements together towards that vision."

In March 2018, Boyle confirmed he would be directing the then-untitled twenty-fifth James Bond film (later known as No Time to Die) but dropped out that August due to a dispute over the film's script.

He and writer Richard Curtis collaborated on Yesterday, starring Himesh Patel, Kate McKinnon, Lily James, and Ed Sheeran, released on 28 June 2019.

Personal life
While at university, Boyle dated actress Frances Barber. He was in a relationship with casting director Gail Stevens from 1983 to 2003, with whom he has three children: Gabriel, Grace, and Caitlin.

Boyle is a constitutional republican. He lives in Mile End, London.

Boyle is the patron of North West-based young people's substance misuse charity, Early Break, which was founded and based in his home town of Radcliffe. He is also a trustee of the UK-based African arts charity Dramatic Need.

In February 2017, Boyle announced a bid to launch a £30 million film and media school in Manchester, stating: "This is just what Manchester needs and I am delighted to be part of the International Screen School Manchester."

Filmography

Film

Executive producer
 Twin Town (1997)
 28 Weeks Later (2007)
 Creation Stories (2021)

Television

TV series

TV movies

Theatre

Awards and nominations

Recognition
In 2010, The Tablet named Boyle one of Britain's most influential Roman Catholics. The BBC referred to Boyle as a "titan of the British film industry – renowned for his spunky grit – typified by his 1996 film Trainspotting." In 2012, Boyle was among the British cultural icons selected by artist Sir Peter Blake to appear in a new version of his most famous artwork – the Beatles' Sgt. Pepper's Lonely Hearts Club Band album cover – to celebrate the British cultural figures of his lifetime.

Bibliography 
 The Filmmakers Filmlovers Survival Triva Cookbook (1984)
 Slumdog Millionaire, Class Set: Helbling Readers Movies/Level 5 (B1) (with Paul Shipton, 2013)

References

External links 

 
 

1956 births
Living people
Alumni of Bangor University
Best Directing Academy Award winners
Best Director BAFTA Award winners
Best Director Golden Globe winners
Directors Guild of America Award winners
English atheists
English film directors
English film producers
English-language film directors
English people of Irish descent
English television directors
English television producers
Former Roman Catholics
People educated at Thornleigh Salesian College
People from Radcliffe, Greater Manchester
English twins
English republicans